Fabrizio Kasslatter (born 6 September 1954) is an Italian ice hockey player. He competed in the men's tournament at the 1984 Winter Olympics.

References

External links

1954 births
Living people
Olympic ice hockey players of Italy
Ice hockey players at the 1984 Winter Olympics
Sportspeople from Brixen